National Highway 710, commonly referred to as NH 710 is a national highway in  India. It is a spur road of National Highway 10. NH-710 traverses the state of Sikkim in India.

Route 
Melli - Manpur- Namchi - Damthang - Tarku.

Junctions  

  Terminal near Tashiview point.
  Terminal near Tarku.

See also 

 List of National Highways in India
 List of National Highways in India by state

References

External links 

 NH 710 on OpenStreetMap

National highways in India
National Highways in Sikkim